Chester was a non-metropolitan local government district of Cheshire, England from 1974 to 2009. It had the status of a city and a borough, and the local authority was called Chester City Council.

Apart from Chester itself, which was the principal settlement, the district covered a large rural area.  Other settlements included Malpas and Tarvin.

History
The district was formed on 1 April 1974, under the Local Government Act 1972, by the merger of the existing city and county borough of Chester with the Chester Rural District and Tarvin Rural District. It was a non-metropolitan district, with county-level services for the area provided by Cheshire County Council.

The new district was awarded borough status from its creation, allowing the chairman of the council to take the title of mayor. The city status which had previously attached to the old county borough of Chester was extended to cover the enlarged district on 28 May 1974, a few weeks after the changes came into effect, allowing the council to call itself Chester City Council.

In 2006 the Department for Communities and Local Government considered reorganising Cheshire's administrative structure as part of the 2009 structural changes to local government in England. The decision to merge Vale Royal with the districts of Chester and Ellesmere Port and Neston to create a single unitary authority was announced on 25 July 2007, following a consultation period in which a proposal to create a single Cheshire unitary authority was rejected.

The Chester district was abolished on 31 March 2009, with the area becoming part of the new unitary authority of Cheshire West and Chester from 1 April 2009. Chester's city charter is retained through the appointment of charter trustees.

Lord mayoralty and shrievalty
The office of mayor of Chester was continued in 1974 by virtue of the charter, the title being borne by the chairman of the council. The mayor of Chester had, since at least 1528, enjoyed the additional honorific title of "Admiral of the Dee". The title was confirmed by letters patent dated 15 May 1974. In 1992, as part of celebrations of the fortieth anniversary of the accession of Elizabeth II, the mayor's title was raised to Lord Mayor of Chester by letters patent dated 10 March 1992.

Under the charter granted in 1974 the new council was permitted to continue to appoint any traditional "officers of dignity" that the predecessor city and county borough had been entitled to appoint. Accordingly, in June 1974 it was decided to continue the office of Sheriff of Chester that dated from the early twelfth century.

The offices of lord mayor and sheriff of Chester were held by serving councillors, and there was an annual rotation of the posts between the three main parties.

Coat of arms
In 1977 the city council was regranted a "differenced" version of the sixteenth century arms of the predecessor Corporation of the City and County Borough of Chester. The historic arms of Chester was based on the Royal Arms of England (three golden lions on a red shield) combined with three gold wheatsheaves on blue of the Earldom of Chester. A gold border bearing acorns was added to the arms to represent the rural areas added in 1974. The crest of the corporation was a depiction of the city sword. To this was added two branches of oak for the two rural districts combined with the county borough. The supporters of the city arms were a gold lion representing England and a white wolf for Hugh Lupus, 1st Earl of Chester. In 1977 they were altered slightly by the addition of red castles hanging about their necks. The Latin motto was Antiqui Colant Antiquum Dierum or Let the ancients worship the ancient of days.

Civil parishes
Chester district contained a comparatively large number of civil parishes. There were 46 parish councils operating in the district in 2008, some of which were grouped parish councils covering more than one civil parish. Some smaller parishes were not covered any parish council, leaving parish level representation to be administered through a parish meeting.

 Agden
 Aldersey
 Aldford
 Ashton Hayes
 Bache
 Backford
 Barrow
 Barton
 Beeston
 Bickley
 Bradley
 Bridge Trafford
 Broxton
 Bruen Stapleford
 Buerton
 Burton
 Burwardsley
 Caldecott
 Capenhurst
 Carden
 Caughall
 Chester Castle
 Chidlow
 Chorlton
 Chorlton by Backford
 Chowley
 Christleton
 Church Shocklach
 Churton by Aldford
 Churton by Farndon
 Churton Heath
 Claverton
 Clotton Hoofield
 Clutton
 Coddington
 Cotton Abbotts
 Cotton Edmunds
 Crewe by Farndon
 Croughton
 Cuddington
 Dodleston
 Duckington
 Duddon
 Dunham on the Hill
 Eaton
 Eccleston
 Edge
 Edgerley
 Elton
 Farndon
 Foulk Stapleford
 Golborne Bellow
 Golborne David
 Grafton
 Great Boughton
 Guilden Sutton
 Hampton
 Handley
 Hapsford
 Harthill
 Hatton
 Hockenhull
 Hoole Village
 Horton by Malpas
 Horton cum Peel
 Huntington
 Huxley
 Iddinshall
 Kelsall
 Kings Marsh
 Larkton
 Lea Newbold
 Lea by Backford
 Ledsham
 Little Stanney
 Littleton
 Lower Kinnerton
 Macefen
 Malpas  (town)
 Marlston cum Lache
 Mickle Trafford
 Mollington
 Moston
 Mouldsworth
 Newton by Malpas
 Newton by Tattenhall
 Oldcastle
 Overton
 Picton
 Poulton
 Prior's Heys
 Puddington
 Pulford
 Rowton
 Saighton
 Saughall
 Shocklach Oviatt
 Shotwick
 Shotwick Park
 Stockton
 Stoke
 Stretton
 Tarvin
 Tattenhall
 Thornton le Moors
 Threapwood
 Tilston
 Tilstone Fearnall
 Tiverton
 Tushingham cum Grindley
 Upton by Chester
 Waverton
 Wervin
 Wigland
 Willington
 Wimbolds Trafford
 Woodbank
 Wychough

The main built-up part of Chester was an unparished area, corresponding to the area of the former county borough. One anomaly was that there was a small civil parish just covering the area around Chester Castle, which was surrounded by the unparished area. This was the civil parish of Chester Castle, which had not been part of the pre-1974 Chester County Borough, but had been a detached part of the Chester Rural District.

Political control
The city of Chester had been a county borough, independent from any county council, from 1889 to 1974. The first elections to the enlarged district created under the Local Government Act 1972 were held in 1973, initially operating as a shadow authority until the new arrangements came into effect on 1 April 1974. Political control of the council from 1974 until its abolition in 2009 was held by the following parties:

Leadership
The leaders of the council were:

Premises

The council had its main offices at The Forum on Northgate Street, Chester, being offices above a shopping centre. The offices at The Forum had been opened on 4 April 1973 for the old city council when it was a county borough, but in anticipation of the reforms due to come into effect in 1974. The offices immediately adjoined Chester Town Hall, where council and committee meetings were held.

Council elections
1973 Chester City Council election
1976 Chester City Council election
1979 Chester City Council election (New ward boundaries)
1980 Chester City Council election
1982 Chester City Council election
1983 Chester City Council election
1984 Chester City Council election
1986 Chester City Council election
1987 Chester City Council election
1988 Chester City Council election (City boundary changes took place but the number of seats remained the same)
1990 Chester City Council election
1991 Chester City Council election
1992 Chester City Council election
1994 Chester City Council election
1995 Chester City Council election
1996 Chester City Council election
1998 Chester City Council election
1999 Chester City Council election (New ward boundaries)
2000 Chester City Council election
2002 Chester City Council election
2003 Chester City Council election
2004 Chester City Council election
2006 Chester City Council election
2007 Chester City Council election

2006 Election
The Conservative Party gained 5 seats in Lache, Newton St. Michael's, Handbridge, Elton and Upton Grange. Labour lost three seats to the Conservatives, and avoided losing Boughton and City to the Conservatives, and College to the Liberal Democrats. The Liberal Democrats lost two seats to the Conservatives, and only avoided losing a safe seat, Vicars Cross, to the Conservatives. In addition, a Liberal Democrat Councillor (Jeff Clarke, Waverton) defected to the Conservatives. The Conservatives also won a by-election in Autumn 2006, taking another seat from the Liberal Democrats.

2007 Election
The Conservative party gained 7 seats in Lache, Newton Brook, Huntington, Tattenhall, Upton Grange, Kelsall and Boughton Heath. They also regained Christleton after the seat had been vacant for four months. The Liberal Democrats were defeated in five seats, Labour in one, and one long-serving Independent (Doug Haynes, Tattenhall) was beaten. Labour were beaten into fourth place in one ward (Malpas) by the English Democrats. The Liberal Democrats narrowly avoided finishing in fourth place in Blacon Hall and Blacon Lodge. Labour held College by just 7 votes, with the Liberal Democrats in second place.

2008 Election
The 2008 elections were cancelled due to local government re-organisation. Elections to a shadow Cheshire West and Chester (CWC) unitary authority were instead held. This meant that councillors elected in 2004 served for an additional year before the city council was disbanded. Therefore, the Conservatives remained the governing party until April 2009, when the new CWC Council replaced the city council.

By-election results

External links
Chester City Council

References

Council elections in Cheshire
Politics of Chester
District council elections in England
English districts abolished in 2009
Districts of England established in 1974
Former non-metropolitan districts of Cheshire
district
Former boroughs in England